Šanov may refer to places in the Czech Republic:

Šanov (Rakovník District), a municipality and village in the Central Bohemian Region
Šanov (Zlín District), a municipality and village in the Zlín Region
Šanov (Znojmo District), a municipality and village in the South Moravian Region